The TUM School of Medicine (TUM MED) is the research-intensive medical school of the Technical University of Munich, located in Munich. Its teaching hospital and biomedical research facility is the Rechts der Isar Hospital.

History 
In 1967, the TUM School of Medicine was established by the Bavarian government as a Department of the Technical University of Munich. The Rechts der Isar Hospital became the teaching hospital of the newly created School.

Departments 
The TUM School of Medicine currently consists of 40 departments:
 Department of General Medicine
 Department of Anesthesiology
 Department of Ophthalmology
 Department of Biological Imaging
 Department of Surgery
 Department of Dermatology and Allergology
 Department of Nutritional Medicine
 Department of Gynecology
 Division of Perinatal Medicine and Perinatal Physiology
 Department of Vascular and Endovascular Surgery
 Department of History and Ethics of Medicine
 Department of Otolaryngology
 Department of Human Genetics
 Department of Pediatric Medicine
 Department of Clinical Chemistry and Pathobiochemistry
 Department of Internal Medicine I - Cardiology
 Department of Internal Medicine II - Gastroenterology
 Division of Nephrology
 Division of Clinical Toxicology
 Department of Internal Medicine III - Hematooncology
 Department of Medical Microbiology, Immunology and Hygiene
 Department of Medical Statistics and Epidemiology
 Department of Molecular Allergology
 Department of Molecular Immunology
 Department of Oral and Maxillofacial Surgery
 Department of Neurosurgery
 Department of Neurology
 Department of Neuroscience
 Department of Nuclear Medicine
 Department of Experimental Oncology and Therapeutic Research
 Department of Orthopedics and Sports Orthopedics
 Division of Sports Orthopedics
 Department of General Pathology and Pathological Anatomy
 Department of Preventive and Rehabilitative Sports Medicine
 Department of Pharmacology and Toxicology
 Department of Plastic Surgery and Hand Surgery
 Department of Psychiatry and Psychotherapy
 Department of Psychosomatic Medicine and Psychotherapy
 Department of Diagnostic and Interventional Radiology
 Division of Interventional Radiology
 Division of Diagnostic and Interventional Neuroradiology
 Department of Radiation Therapy and Radiooncology
 Department of Toxicology and Environmental Hygiene
 Department of Trauma Surgery
 Department of Urology
 Department of Virology

Rankings 

In clinical medicine, The TUM School of Medicine has been rated No. 59 in the world (No. 3 in Germany) by QS, No. 60 in the world (No. 4 in Germany) by THE, and No. 101–150 in the world (No. 6–9 in Germany) by ARWU.

In medical technology, ARWU ranks TUM No. 21 in the world and No. 2 nationally.

In the national 2020 CHE University Ranking, the department is rated in the top group in 19 out of 24 criteria, including research, study organization, facilities, and overall study situation.

In 2018, TUM was recognized as 10th in the world for expertise in Pancreatic Cancer by Expertscape.

References 

 
1967 establishments in Germany
Educational institutions established in 1967
Medical schools in Germany